Pooncarie is a village in south-western New South Wales, Australia in Wentworth Shire.  It is on the eastern side of the Darling River between Wentworth and Menindee. The surrounding region of Pooncarie is semi-arid with an outback landscape rich in eucalypt woodlands.

History

The region was first settled by Europeans during the 1840s when they took up illegal grazing runs on crown land. During the 1860s the government formalised these illegal (and unfenced) claims in an attempt to gain control of the region. As more settlers followed the town became a service hub for outlying stations. In the mid-19th century, the town's Darling River wharf was very active as paddle-steamers carried wool from north-western NSW and south-western Queensland, travelling through the port on the way to South Australia.

The Burke and Wills expedition passed through Pooncarie on their journey across Australia from Melbourne to the Gulf of Carpentaria. They reached the Darling River near Tarcoola Station to the south of town on Wednesday, 26 September 1860 and the next day made Camp XXX (their thirtieth camp since leaving Melbourne) at what is now Bilbarka Park. The expedition stayed here until the morning of 11 October 1860 when they headed north to Menindee.

In 1863 the town was originally gazetted as "Pooncaira".

Popiltah station, 80 km north-west of Pooncarie, was the relocation site of Nanya and his family, one of the last peoples to live by traditional indigenous means in New South Wales.

The mine commenced partial operations in December 2005.

Today the village has a postal centre and Centrelink office (which is housed in the former Pooncarie police station), a school, a cafe (situated overlooking the Darling river at the historic Old Wharf site), a hotel, a golf course, a tennis court, a general store, a cemetery, and a racecourse, where the Pooncarie Cup - held on Labour Day (NSW and SA) - attracts a crowd of over 1,500 enthusiasts.

Heritage listings 
Wentworth Shire has a number of heritage-listed sites, including:

 Darling River, Polia Station, Pooncarie: PS Rodney

Climate
Pooncarie has a hot desert climate (BWh) under the Köppen climate classification, featuring very hot, dry summers and short, cool winters.

See also
Burke and Wills expedition

References

External links

 Burke & Wills Web - a comprehensive website containing many of the historical documents relating to the Burke & Wills Expedition
 The Burke & Wills Historical Society The Burke & Wills Historical Society.
  Pooncarie Cemetery records

Towns in New South Wales
Populated places on the Darling River
Wentworth Shire
Pooncarie, New South Wales